Acıbadem is a neighborhood in Kadıköy and Üsküdar district of Istanbul, Turkey, on the Anatolian side. It is a quiet neighborhood in Istanbul.

Transport
Metro
M4 Kadıköy-Tavşantepe (extension to Sabiha Gökçen airport is under construction)

References

Neighbourhoods of Kadıköy